Holy Rosary Academy may refer to:

Holy Rosary Academy (Alaska) — Anchorage, Alaska
Holy Rosary Academy (Hinunangan, Philippines)

See also
Rosary Academy (Fullerton, California)